Professional Pensions magazine is a weekly Incisive Media publication covering the UK institutional pensions industry. The magazine was published by MSM International Ltd. from its launch in 1995 until December 2006 when the company was acquired by Incisive Media.

The current editor is Jonathan Stapleton. Past editors include Alex Beveridge (2008–2009) and Len Roberts (2000–2008).

Circulation
The ABC Audited average circulation for the Professional Pensions print edition for the period 1 July 2018 – 30 June 2019 was 8,197.

Professional Pensions mobile allows customers to access PP content via any mobile device, including iPhones and BlackBerries.

References

External links
 Professional Pensions
 UK Pensions Awards

1995 establishments in the United Kingdom
Magazines established in 1995
Magazines published in London
Pensions in the United Kingdom
Weekly magazines published in the United Kingdom